Stalled Out in the Doorway is the debut album by Canadian singer-songwriter Tomi Swick, released August 15, 2006.

The album was nominated for Pop Album of the Year at the 2007 Juno Awards.

Track listing
 "Come in 2s"
 "Wait Until Morning"
 "Everything Is Alright"
 "Still in the Light"
 "I Trust In (Family)"
 "Sorry Again"
 "Habits"
 "A Night Like This"
 "Listen Isa"
 "Easy Company"
 "I'll See You Again"
 "Stalled Out in the Doorway"

References

2006 albums
Tomi Swick albums